Lycaon may refer to:

Mythology
 Lycaon (Greek myth), name of mythological characters named Lycaon
 Lycaon (son of Priam), son of king Priam of Troy by Laothoe
 Lycaon (king of Arcadia), son of Pelasgus and Meliboea, the mythical first king of Arcadia
 Lycaon, brother or son of Eurypylus of Cyrene

Biology
 Lycaon (genus), a genus containing one extant species, the African wild dog
 Canis lupus lycaon, the eastern wolf
 Hyponephele lycaon, the dusky meadow brown butterfly

Other uses
 Lycaon (band), a Japanese visual kei rock band
 4792 Lykaon, an asteroid

See also
Lycurgus (disambiguation)
Lycan (disambiguation)